Nagorny Park — is the oldest park in Barnaul, Altai Krai, Russia.

The park opened in 1993 and is located at Central District of Barnaul. The park was created by the memorial zone of the Barnaul history.

History  
The park was founded by A. Demidov in 1772 as Nagorny cemetery, where famous people of Barnaul were buried.

From 1956 to 1993, the Altai VDNH was located here.

Barnaul
Parks in Russia
Geography of Altai Krai
Protected areas established in 1993
1993 establishments in Russia
Tourist attractions in Altai Krai